Kampala Kingdom is a Mall and shopping complex in Kampala, Uganda's capital city.

Location
The Mall is located on Nakasero Hill, an upscale neighborhood in Kampala, the capital and largest city of Uganda. The piece of property where the mall is located is bordered by Nile Avenue to the north, Yusuf Lule Road to the east, and De Winton Road to the south. The National Theater and Uganda Broadcasting Corporation border the location to the west. The mall complex is being erected on a  site that was previously occupied by Shimoni Teacher Training College, which was relocated to Kitikifumba in Kira Municipality. The coordinates of the mall are 0°19'02.0"N, 32°35'28.0"E (Latitude:0.317223; Longitude:32.591112).

Overview
Kampala Kingdom is part of a business/residential real estate development that includes:
 A 200-room four-star mall tower - The Kampala Kingdom mall.
 Rentable retail and office space, measuring in excess of 
 Parking space for over 450 vehicles.

History
In 2006, Kingdom mall Investments (KHI), a real estate investment and development company, headquartered in Dubai, United Arab Emirates, leased  in the center of Kampala from the government of Uganda for 99 years. KHI planned to construct a luxury mall complex on the property, with the opening date planned for 2009. KHI is chaired by Alwaleed Bin Talal, a prince of Saudi Arabia.

Following the Global Recession of 2008 and 2009, KHI became unable to fund the project on its own. They sold majority shareholding in the development to Azure Holdings Limited, a subsidiary of the Mara Group, also headquartered in Dubai. Mara Group is also the parent company of Kensington Uganda Limited, a real estate investment and development company. Construction of the mall, technically known as Kingdom Kampala mall, began in July 2010. InterContinental mall has signed an agreement with the mall developers to manage the mall when completed.

In January 2016, Crane Management Services, a subsidiary of the Ruparelia Group and South African developer Abland Africa, entered into a joint venture with Kingdom mall Limited to complete the construction of the mall complex. The new development entails a 200 bedroom 4 star mall,  office space and  rentable space. Completion is planned for 2018 at an estimated cost of US$300 million.

Construction
The mall, office tower and conference complex are estimated to cost US$300 million in construction. Commissioning is expected during the 2nd quarter of calendar year 2019.

See also
 Kampala Capital City Authority
 List of hotels in Uganda
 Kampala Central Division
 InterContinental Hotels
 List of tallest buildings in Kampala

References

External links
 Website of Kingdom mall Investments
 Website of Kingdom Kampala Real Estate Development
 Kingdom Kampala, a city within Kampala City As of 14 July 2018.

Hotels in Kampala
Ruparelia Group
Buildings and structures in Kampala
Hotel buildings completed in 2019
2019 establishments in Uganda